Burnt ends are flavorful pieces of meat cut from the "point" half of a smoked brisket.
When brisket muscles are separated, the lean "first cut" or "flat cut" is the deep pectoral, while the fattier "point", also known as the "second cut", "fat end", or "triangular cut", is the superficial pectoral. A traditional part of Kansas City-style barbecue, burnt ends are considered a delicacy in barbecue cooking.  Either the entire brisket is cooked whole, then the point end is removed and cooked further, or the point and flat are separated prior to cooking. Due to the higher fat content of the brisket point, it takes longer to fully cook to tender and render out fat and collagen. This longer cooking gave rise to the name "burnt ends". Sometimes when the flat is done, the point is returned to the smoker for further cooking. Some cooks re-season the point at this time.   

Kansas City style burnt ends are usually served chopped with sauce either on top or on the side. A "proper" burnt end should display a modest amount of "bark" or char on at least one side. Burnt ends can be served alone (sometimes smothered in barbecue sauce) or in sandwiches, as well as in a variety of other dishes, including baked beans and French fries.

Kansas City native Calvin Trillin is often credited with popularizing burnt ends. In a 1972 article he wrote for Playboy about Arthur Bryant's restaurant in Kansas City,  he wrote: "The main course at Bryant's, as far as I'm concerned, is something that is given away free – the burned edges of the brisket. The counterman just pushes them over to the side and anyone who wants them helps himself. I dream of those burned edges. Sometimes, when I’m in some awful, overpriced restaurant in some strange town, trying to choke down some three-dollar hamburger that tastes like a burned sponge, a blank look comes over me: I have just realized that at that very moment, someone in Kansas City is being given those burned edges for free.”

See also
 Grilling
 List of smoked foods

References

Barbecue
Smoked meat
American meat dishes